Pierre Adolphe Lesson (1805-1888), also as Pierre-Adolphe Lesson, was a French botanist.

Select publications by Lesson

References

External links 
 
 
 
 

1805 births
1888 deaths
19th-century French botanists
French explorers